Richard Baldwin may refer to:

Richard C. Baldwin (born 1947), judge on the Oregon Supreme Court
Richard J. Baldwin (1853–1944), Speaker of the Pennsylvania House of Representatives, 1917–1918
Richard Baldwin (economist), American professor of international economics
Richard Baldwin (provost) ( 1672–1758), provost of Trinity College, Dublin
Richard Baldwin (publisher) (c. 1653–1698), British printer accused of seditious work
Rick Baldwin (1955–1997), American racing driver